HD 131496 is an evolved subgiant star in the constellation Boötes.  With an apparent visual magnitude of 7.9 it is too faint to be visible to the naked eye.  Stars like HD 131496 are sometimes referred to as "retired A-stars", since they would have been A-type stars while on the main sequence.  This name is most commonly used in connection with the search for extrasolar planets, where they are useful because these evolved stars are cooler and have more spectral lines than their main sequence counterparts, making planet detection easier.

Planetary system
A planet with a mass roughly 2.2 times that of Jupiter orbiting at a distance of 2.09 astronomical units (AU) once every 883 days was discovered in 2011.

HD 131496 and its planet, HD 131496b, were chosen as part of the 2019 NameExoWorlds campaign organised by the International Astronomical Union, which assigned each country a star and planet to be named.  HD 131496 was assigned to Andorra.  The winning proposal for the name of the star was Arcalís, after a mountain peak in northern Andorra where the Sun shines through a gap twice a year at fixed dates, leading to its use as a primitive Solar calendar.  The planet was named Madriu, after a glacial valley and river in southeastern Andorra that forms the major part of the Madriu-Perafita-Claror UNESCO world heritage site.

References

Boötes
K-type subgiants
Durchmusterung objects
131497
072845
Arcalís
Planetary systems with one confirmed planet